"Look at You" is a song recorded by American country music duo Big & Rich.  It was released in January 2014 as the first single from their album Gravity.  The song was written by John Rich, one half of the duo, and Shannon Lawson.

Music video
The music video was directed by Trey Fanjoy and premiered in September 2014, starring Aurelia Scheppers as the lead actress.

Chart performance
"Look at You" debuted at number 54 on the U.S. Billboard Country Airplay chart for the week of March 15, 2014. It eventually peaked at number 7 on that chart, making it the duo's second top ten song, the first being "Lost in This Moment". As of December 2014, the song has sold 350,000 copies in the United States.

Year-end charts

Certifications

References

2014 songs
2014 singles
Big & Rich songs
Songs written by John Rich
Song recordings produced by John Rich
Music videos directed by Trey Fanjoy
Songs written by Shannon Lawson